Bentley Rhythm Ace (BRA) are a British electronic music duo formed in Birmingham in 1995, consisting of Mike Stokes and Richard March.

Career
The band was formed in Birmingham by Richard March, formerly with the group Pop Will Eat Itself, and Mike Stokes formerly with Bugweed Centipede, with guest appearances by James Atkin, a member of indie band EMF. "Both more or less penniless, they drank in the same pub and were forced to buy their records at the cheapest place possible - car boot sales". Their live drummers include Keith York and Car SOS's Fuzz Townshend (alongside whom March previously played with in Pop Will Eat Itself), while EMF's James Atkin is also involved with BRA as a touring member.

BRA signed on the Brighton based record label Skint and released their eponymous debut album, Bentley Rhythm Ace in 1997, which spawned the popular single "Bentleys Gonna Sort You Out!".

A second album, For Your Ears Only, was released in 2000 on Parlophone but was less popular. A further single "Madam, Your Carriage Awaits" was released. The group also compiled a two CD FSUK compilation album. In 2004, the Bentleys released a 4-song record with Sophia Lolley called Angel Face.

The name probably refers to the Rhythm Ace line of analogue drum machines manufactured by Ace Tone, some of which were rebranded and distributed by Bentley Pianos in the UK.

The group epitomises the big beat era. Signed to Skint Records, they enjoyed commercial success with their music being used on television advertisements and having an underground following.

The group split in 2000 after which they played the occasional low-key DJ set. In 2016, the duo reformed and played live sets across the UK at festivals, supporting The Wonder Stuff's December tour and headlining a few of their own shows.

Discography

Albums

Singles

DJ mixes
 FSUK3 (1998)

Band members
 Richard March (born 4 March 1965, York, England) - bass, keyboards, programming, engineering
 Mike Stokes (born 15 June 1971, Birmingham, England) -  turntables, samples
 James Atkin (vocalist for EMF, born 28 March 1969, Birmingham) - vocals, guitars
 Fuzz Townshend (born 31 July 1964, Hammersmith, London, England) - drums

References

External links
 Bentley Rhythm Ace page on Myspace
 Bentley Rhythm Ace discography on Discogs

English electronic music duos
Musical groups established in 1995
Musical groups from Birmingham, West Midlands
Big beat groups